Strumariinae is one of four subtribes within the tribe Amaryllideae (subfamily Amaryllidoideae, family Amaryllidaceae), found in southern Africa.

Description 

The leaves are often prostrate (on the ground). The flowers may be zygomorphic or actinomorphic, and may or may not have a perigone tube. The stamens are connate (fused) into a tube at their proximal end. However Strumaria has one whorl of the stamens fused to the style. The fruit is dehiscent with seeds that have a well-developed integument that is chlorophyllous with a stomatose testa.

Taxonomy

Phylogeny 
Strumariinae are placed within Amaryllideae as follow:

These are phylogenetically related as follows:

Subdivision 

Strumariinae consists of six genera, related as follows, with number of species in each genus in (parentheses):

References

Bibliography 

 
 
 Snijman, D. A. and H. P. Linder. 1996. Phylogenetic relationships, seed characters, and dispersal system evolution in Amaryllideae (Amaryllidaceae). Annals of the Missouri Botanical Garden 83: 362-386
 
 
 Katja Weiehhardt-Kulessa, Thomas Bórner, Jiirgen Sehmitz, Ute Müller-Doblies, and Dietrich Müller-Doblies. 2000. Controversial taxonomy of Strumariinae (Amaryllidaceae) investigated by nuclear rDNA (ITS) sequences. 1. Hessea, Namaquanula, Kamiesbergia, and Dewinterella. Plant Syst. Evol. 223:1-13 (2000)

External links 

Amaryllidoideae
Plant subtribes